Gerd Zimmermann or Gerhard Zimmermann may refer to:
Gerd Zimmermann (speed skater) (born 1942), German speed skater
Gerd Zimmermann (footballer) (1949–2022), German football player